= Grunge metal =

Grunge metal may refer to:

- Grunge, a genre of rock music
- Alternative metal, a genre of heavy metal music
